Athanasios "Thanasi" Kokkinakis (born 10 April 1996) is an Australian professional tennis player. He has been ranked as high as world No. 69 in singles by the ATP, which he first achieved on 8 June 2015. He has won one ATP Tour title in singles and produced his best Major singles performance at the 2015 French Open by reaching the third round. Kokkinakis also has a career-high doubles ranking of world No. 15 which he attained on 21 November 2022 after winning the 2022 Australian Open and reaching the semifinals of 2022 Miami Open with countryman Nick Kyrgios.

As a junior, Kokkinakis was ranked as high as No. 10 in the world. He won one junior Grand Slam title, the doubles title at the 2013 Wimbledon Championships with partner Nick Kyrgios, and was the runner-up in two additional junior Grand Slam singles finals that same year. As a professional, Kokkinakis broke into the top 100 for the first time in 2015, during which he won one title on the ATP Challenger Tour and made the fourth round of an ATP Masters 1000 tournament for the first time at the 2015 Indian Wells Masters. After an injury-plagued 2016, he reached his first two ATP Tour finals the next year, when he won the 2017 Brisbane International doubles title with Jordan Thompson but lost at the 2017 Los Cabos Open in singles to Sam Querrey. In 2018, Kokkinakis won two additional Challenger titles and ended the year having re-entered the top 150. However, over the next two years, further injuries prevented him from regularly competing on the professional circuit, but he made his return in 2021 and he reached two Challenger finals, of which he won one. He continued his comeback in 2022 and appeared in his first ATP Tour final in five years at the 2022 Adelaide International 2, in which he prevailed in front of a home-town audience to secure his maiden ATP Tour singles title. He then won the Australian Open doubles title partnering Kyrgios, and the pair competed in the year-end championships.

Personal life
Kokkinakis was born in Adelaide to Greek immigrant parents, Trevor (Tryfon) from Kalamata, Greece and Voula (Paraskevi) from Tripoli, Greece. He attended Scotch College throughout his upbringing in Adelaide. Kokkinakis also holds Greek citizenship and is a citizen of Perivolakia Pylos. His tennis idols growing up were Marat Safin and Roger Federer.

Career

2008–2010: Junior career
As a junior, Kokkinakis had a breakthrough when in March 2008 he won the 12 year old National Lawn Tennis tournament in Mildura beating Joshua Bray 6–1, 6–2 in the final. This was a big stepping stone after being beaten in the previous 12 year old National Hardcourt Tennis Tournament in January 2008 by Lochlan Greene in straight sets in the round of 16. This tournament was won by Nick Kyrgios. In 2009, Kokkinakis was selected with fellow Australian tennis representatives James Ma, Li Tu and Daniel Talens, on a Tennis Australian European tour. He has repeatedly said that this tour changed the course of his career.

Kokkinakis received a wildcard into the 2013 Australian Open juniors tournament and eventually reached the final taking down the 12th, 2nd and 11th seeds on his way. In the final he faced fellow Australian Nick Kyrgios. After having two set points in the first set he eventually lost 7–6(7–4), 6–3.

In June, he returned to competitive play at Wimbledon, and made the third round in the boys' singles and won the boys' doubles with Nick Kyrgios.

Kokkinakis lost the final of US Open Boys' Singles, losing in three sets against Borna Ćorić, 6–3, 3–6, 1–6. Following the result, Kokkinakis reached a career high junior ranking of 10.

Despite still being eligible, Kokkinakis elected not to play junior events in 2014 and instead focused on the men's tour.

2011–2013: Professional career debut

Kokkinakis began his professional career in March 2011 at the Australia F3 Future's event at the age of 14 where he lost 6–8 in the third set tiebreak to Leon Frost. He recorded his first professional win the following week against Kento Takeuchi at the Australia F4 event. He then lost in the second round to Michael Venus.

In 2012, after playing Futures events in Australia, Slovenia, Germany and the Netherlands, Kokkinakis equaled his best result of the year by reaching the semifinals of the Belgium F4 event. He then returned to play Futures in Australia where he reached back to back quarterfinals in the F5 and F6 events, losing to Luke Saville both times. He finished the year by reaching the semifinals at the Australia F12 event where he lost to Ben Mitchell.

He began 2013 by filling-in on the United States and German teams during the 2013 Hopman Cup as a replacement for injured John Isner and Tommy Haas. Kokkinakis competed in the qualifying competition of the 2013 Australian Open, losing to Steve Johnson 15–17 in the third set. Kokkinakis sustained a stress fracture in his back in the Australian Open boys' final which kept him out of competition until mid 2013. He then returned to competition playing Futures tournaments in the Czech Republic, Canada and the United States with the highlight being a quarterfinal of the Canada F5 event. In September and October, Kokkinakis competed in two Challenger events in the United States. The first was the 2013 Napa Valley Challenger where he qualified and reached the second round, going down to Bradley Klahn despite leading by a set. Then in the 2013 Sacramento Challenger he qualified and made the second round. He again lost despite leading by a set against Nick Kyrgios. As a result of this, his ranking increased to a career best of number 655. In October, Kokkinakis paired up with Benjamin Mitchell and won the Melbourne Challenger defeating Alex Bolt and Andrew Whittington in the final in straight sets. This increased his doubles ranking by 453 places, which put him up to a career high of number 505. He also reached the second round in the singles. He looked like he would cause a big upset after taking the first set against Matt Ebden before losing the next two sets. He finished his year at the 2013 Traralgon Challenger where he lost in the second round to James Duckworth in straight sets.

Despite missing half of the year due to injury, Kokkinakis finished 2013 with a ranking of number 627.

2014–2015: Breakthrough to top 100
Kokkinakis began 2014 in qualifying at the 2014 Brisbane International after receiving a wildcard. He qualified and drew fellow Australian and eventual tournament champion Lleyton Hewitt in round one where he went down in straight sets. On 8 January, Kokkinakis was awarded a wild card into the 2014 Australian Open. He defeated Igor Sijsling in the first round in four sets despite suffering from cramp. He was defeated in the second round by top seed and world number one Rafael Nadal.

Kokkinakis reached the semis of the 2014 Heilbronner Neckarcup coming through the qualifying and beating Jesse Huta Galung, Michael Russell and Marsel İlhan. He then lost to number 1 seed Jan-Lennard Struff and missed out on a place in his first ATP challenger tour final. Kokkinakis received a wild card in the French Open qualifying rounds, where he made the final, and despite having match point in the third set, he lost to Ante Pavić, 6–4, 6–7, 5–7. This result improved his ranking inside the top 300 for the first time. Kokkinakis won his first singles title in Canada on July 13, defeating Fritz Wolmarans in the final. Kokkinakis then qualified for the 2014 Shenzhen Open. He beat Egor Gerasimov 7–6(7–3), 6–1 in the first round for a place in the second round where he got beaten by 6th seed Santiago Giraldo 6–4, 6–3. Kokkinakis qualified for his second career Masters 1000 in Shanghai, but lost to Feliciano López in the 1st round 7–6, 3–6, 4–6.

Kokkinakis finished 2014 with a ranking of number 150.

Kokkinakis began 2015 at the Brisbane International where he received a wild card into the main draw. In the first round he defeated 8th seed Julien Benneteau in straight sets. He lost in the second round against compatriot Bernard Tomic. Kokkinakis and Grigor Dimitrov were also awarded a wildcard into the doubles event. They reached the semifinals, where they lost to Kei Nishikori and Alexandr Dolgopolov.

Kokkinakis received a wildcard also into the 2015 Australian Open, where he defeated 11th seed Ernests Gulbis in the first round, and then lost to compatriot Sam Groth in five sets in round 2. In February, Kokkinakis qualified for three ATP World Tour events; Memphis, Delray and Mexican Open. In March, Kokkinakis played his first live rubber at the Davis Cup. He defeated Czech, Lukáš Rosol in five sets, 4–6, 2–6, 7–5, 7–5, 6–3. He was awarded a wild card into Indian Wells where he defeated Jan-Lennard Struff, Guillermo García López and Juan Mónaco before losing to Bernard Tomic in the fourth round.  
Next, he competed in the Miami Open, where he lost in the first round to Carlos Berlocq.  Following, he competed in Istanbul Open where he completed three rounds of qualifying, but losing in the round of 32 to Dušan Lajović 6–4, 7–5.
Following Istanbul, he qualified for the Madrid Open, and he fell in the first round to Sam Querrey in three sets, however, this improved his ranking and broke him into the top 100 for the first time. 
He won the Challenger BNP Paribas Primrose (Bordeaux) defeating Thiemo de Bakker, then got a wildcard into the French Open, where he defeated Nikoloz Basilashvili and 27th seed Bernard Tomic in the second round before losing to eventual finalist and world number 1 Novak Djokovic.

Kokkinakis began his grass court season at the Queen's Club Championships after being awarded a last minute wildcard following the withdrawal of Kyle Edmund. In his opening match he beat Jérémy Chardy, but lost in the second round to Gilles Simon. Kokkinakis was defeated in round 1 of Wimbledon against 24th seed Leonardo Mayer. He also contested the Men's doubles with Lleyton Hewitt and the pair reached the 3rd round before losing to eventual champions Rojer/Tecău. Kokkinakis then played for Australia at the Davis Cup quarterfinals where he lost to Mikhail Kukushkin in straight sets. He was then replaced in the reverse singles by Lleyton Hewitt who secured Australia a spot in the semifinals.

On August 12, 2015, Nick Kyrgios revealed that Kokkinakis had previously slept with Donna Vekić, alleged girlfriend of Stan Wawrinka, while playing Wawrinka at the Montreal Masters. Kokkinakis later responded to Kyrgios's comments, saying "I let him know. I made it pretty clear that he can't be doing that. If he's got a problem, he's got to say it in private. The way he went about it definitely wasn't the right thing." In his first match after the incident, he was involved in an altercation with American Ryan Harrison during their qualifying match at the Cincinnati Masters, with one report alleging that Harrison threatened physical violence against Kokkinakis and insulted his crew.

Kokkinakis finished, 2015, with a ranking of 80.

2016: First injury-plagued year
On December 24, 2015, Kokkinakis announced that he would sit out the entire Australian summer of tennis, including the Australian Open, due to an ongoing left shoulder injury. Kokkinakis also missed the 2016 French Open and 2016 Wimbledon Championships. Kokkinakis' first competitive match in 2016 came at the 2016 Summer Olympics, where he lost in the first round to Gastão Elias. On August 25, Kokkinakis announced he would miss the US Open due to a pulled pectoral muscle. Kokkinakis later announced his injuries were caused by vanity, as he lifted weights to increase his bicep size especially with the news that Nike was bringing out new sleeveless tops.

2017–2018: Return and victories
Kokkinakis' made his comeback at the Brisbane International after receiving a wildcard in doubles with Jordan Thompson. The duo made it to the final, defeating the top seeds en route, where they won the title, the first Australian duo to win the Brisbane International, defeating Gilles Müller and Sam Querrey. Kokkinakis was granted a singles wildcard at the Apia International, where he was scheduled to play Thompson in the first round, but withdrew due to injury. He subsequently withdrew from the Australian Open. In May, Kokkinakis returned to competitive play in doubles with Alex Bolt at Bordeaux Challenger where they reached the quarterfinals. Using a protective ranking, Kokkinakis played his first singles match since October 2015 at Lyon losing to Denis Istomin in straight sets. In June, Kokkinakis defeated Mikhail Youzhny at ‘s-Hertogenbosch. This was his first ATP tour win since August 2015. In the second round, he lost to Daniil Medvedev. The following week, Kokkinakis received a wildcard into Queen's where he defeated Milos Raonic in his opening match in straight sets to record his first top 10 victory. He lost to Daniil Medvedev in the second round for the second consecutive week. Entering the Los Cabos Open as a wildcard, Kokkinakis first defeated world no. 60 Frances Tiafoe in straight tie breaker sets. He then followed that with two more wins over Peter Polansky and Taylor Fritz to reach the semifinals. He then upset the first seed and Wimbledon 2017 semifinalist Tomáš Berdych to reach his first ATP final, losing to Sam Querrey. In August, Kokkinakis lost in round 1 of the US Open to Janko Tipsarević. This was his final match of the year and ended 2017 with a singles rank of 209.

Kokkinakis commenced the year at the Australian Open, but lost to Daniil Medvedev in round 1.
In March, Kokkinakis lost qualifying for Indian Wells, before qualifying for the 2018 Miami Open where he defeated world No. 1 Roger Federer in the second round in three sets, 3–6 6–3 7–6, gaining the biggest victory of his career. He lost to Fernando Verdasco in the third round, in a close third-set tiebreaker. He suffered another setback when cracking a kneecap at the Monte Carlo Masters.

In May, Kokkinakis lost in the second round of qualifying of the French Open and in June, in the third round of qualifying of Wimbledon. In July, Kokkinakis lost in the first round at Atlanta and Los Cabos, but reached the final of the doubles in Los Cabos. In August, Kokkinakis returned the Challenger Tour and won both the singles and doubles titles at Nordic Naturals. The victory marked Kokkinakis' second singles challenger title and first since 2015.

2019: Second injury-plagued year
In January 2019, Kokkinakis qualified for and lost in the first round of the 2019 Brisbane International. Kokkinakis qualified for the 2019 Australian Open, but retired in the first round against Taro Daniel. In April, Kokkinakis returned to the ATP Challenger Tour in Barletta, reaching the second round before withdrawing with an injury. In July, Kokkinakis, returned to the Challenger tour in Winnetka; but withdrew before his semi final match because of an injury. The injury kept him out of the 2019 French Open and Wimbledon.

In July, Kokkinakis was awarded a wildcard into 2019 Los Cabos Open. He defeated Maxime Janvier in the first round to record his first win on the ATP Tour in 492 days; when he defeated Roger Federer at the 2018 Miami Open.

He then backed up that win at the 2019 US Open where he took out Ilya Ivashka in four sets, setting up a second-round meeting with second seed Rafael Nadal. Moments before the match, however, he was forced to withdraw due to a right shoulder injury.

In September, Kokkinakis reached the final of the Tiburon Challenger, where he went on to lose to Tommy Paul in three sets.

2021–2022: Return, first doubles win, and ATP Finals
For the 2021 Australian Open, Kokkinakis was selected as a wildcard for the Men's Singles Draw after two years of injury setbacks. He won his first main draw singles match at the Australian Open since 2015 against Kwon Soon-woo in straight sets before losing to 5th seed Stefanos Tsitsipas in a 4.5 hour, epic 5 set match.

Kokkinakis also qualified for the Miami Masters, where after beating fellow qualifier Shintaro Mochizuki, he lost in the second round to 29th seed Márton Fucsovics in a tightly contested 3-set match.

He consistently made a string of quarterfinals at challenger events, reaching the stage in both Split events, the second event in Rome and the first event in Biella. He reached his first challenger final in almost 2 years, and won his first challenger title in almost 3 at the second Biella Challenger, beating Enzo Couacaud in the final.

After failing to qualify for the French Open, Kokkinakis' next event was Nottingham, where he lost in a tight 3-set match to defending champion and top seed Dan Evans.

Kokkinakis was again given a wildcard into the tournament in Los Cabos, a tournament he had made the finals in 4 years prior. He would lose in the first round to Denis Kudla.

In July, Kokkinakis made the semifinals of another challenger in Lexington, beating Christian Harrison, Juan Pablo Ficovich, and top seed Jenson Brooksby before losing in the semifinals to Alejandro Tabilo in 3 sets. In September, he reached the final of a second Challenger for 2021 at the 2021 Sibiu Open where he was defeated by Stefano Travaglia. Kokkinakis ended 2021 with an ATP singles rank of 171.

Kokkinakis began his season as a wildcard at home in the first Adelaide tournament, beating John Millman in straight sets and 4th seed Frances Tiafoe after being a set and a break down. He defeated Mikael Ymer in the quarterfinals to reach a first semifinal on the ATP Tour in almost five years. In the semifinal, he was defeated by top seed & eventual champion Gaël Monfils in straight sets. At the second tournament, Kokkinakis bettered his result, beating Benoît Paire, second seed John Isner and fellow Australian wildcard Aleksandar Vukic. He defeated 3rd seed Marin Čilić in the semifinals after saving 2 match points to reach the second final of his career, the first since 2017. He defeated Arthur Rinderknech in the final in 3 sets to win his first ATP Tour-level singles title.

Kokkinakis was awarded a wildcard into the 2022 Australian Open, where he lost to qualifier Yannick Hanfmann in straight sets. He received a wildcard into the doubles as well, where he partnered with Nick Kyrgios. Kokkinakis and Kyrgios advanced to the quarterfinals, upsetting top seeds Nikola Mektić and Mate Pavić and 15th seeds Ariel Behar and Gonzalo Escobar on their way there. They beat 6th seeds Tim Pütz and Michael Venus to reach the semifinals. This was the most Australians to progress to this stage at this Major in 29 years, including their fellow Australians Ebden/Purcell, and the first time two all-Australian pairs contested the semifinals since 1985. They defeated 3rd seeds Marcel Granollers and Horacio Zeballos in the semifinal to advance to the final. The final against Matthew Ebden and Max Purcell was the first all-Australian doubles final since 1980. Kokkinakis and Kyrgios won their first doubles Grand Slam in straight sets, becoming the first all-Australian men's doubles champions at the Australian Open since Todd Woodbridge and Mark Woodforde triumphed in 1997. As a result, he moved to the top 50 in the doubles rankings at No. 46 on 31 January 2022.

At his next two tournaments in Delray Beach and Indian Wells, Kokkinakis lost in straight sets in the first round to Sebastian Korda. In the doubles at Indian Wells, partnering Kyrgios, he lost to eventual champions John Isner and Jack Sock in the second round. He eventually won a first round match in Miami against Richard Gasquet in straight sets, and saved a match point before recovering to upset 13th seed Diego Schwartzman in 3 sets for his first top 20 win since beating Roger Federer 4 years prior. He beat qualifier Denis Kudla in the third round in a third set tiebreak to reach the 4th round at a masters for the first time since 2015 Indian Wells. He lost to 2nd seed and world no. 3 Alexander Zverev in straight sets in the fourth round. In the doubles, again partnering Kyrgios, he reached the semifinals, beating Granollers and Zeballos a second time on their way. The pair lost to eventual champions Hubert Hurkacz and John Isner in the semifinals.

Kokkinakis played his first clay court tournament of 2022 in Geneva, where in the first round, he upset Fabio Fognini in straight sets, then beat 7th seed Federico Delbonis in 3 sets to reach the quarterfinals. There, he lost to second seed and defending champion Casper Ruud in straight sets.

At the 2022 Wimbledon Championships he recorded his first win at this Major over Kamil Majchrzak. In the second round, Kokkinakis lost to number 1 seed and eventual champion Novak Djokovic in straight sets.

In Atlanta, Kokkinakis lost in the first round of the singles against wildcard Andres Martin. In the doubles, he won his second title with Kyrgios, beating fellow Australians Jason Kubler and John Peers. The following week in Los Cabos, as the 7th seed, Kokkinakis beat Fernando Verdasco in 3 sets before losing to Steve Johnson in the second round.

Kokkinakis and Kyrgios qualified for the 2022 ATP Finals in Turin as a result of being guaranteed to stay inside the top 20 as a pair and having won the Australian Open.

2023–present: First top 10 win in 5 years, 4th Australian Open second round
Kokkinakis started his year in Adelaide. In the first tournament, Kokkinakis defeated Maxime Cressy but lost in the second round to Jannik Sinner. In the second tournament, Kokkinakis defeated Andrey Rublev in the second round in 3 sets for his first top 10 win since beating Federer 5 years prior. He reached the semifinals, where he lost to Roberto Bautista Agut in 3 sets. As a result of his semifinals loss, he fell out of the world's top 150. At the Australian Open, Kokkinakis beat Fabio Fognini in straight sets in the first round to reach the second round in Melbourne for the fourth time in his career. He lost to Andy Murray in the second round in five sets.

After winning Manama, Kokkinakis returned to the top 100 and received a wildcard into Dubai.

At the 2023 BNP Paribas Open he lost in the second round to top seed Carlos Alcaraz.

Performance timelines

Singles
Current competing in the 2023 BNP Paribas Open

Doubles

Significant finals

Grand Slam finals

Doubles: 1 (1 title)

ATP career finals

Singles: 2 (1 title, 1 runner-up)

Doubles: 4 (3 titles, 1 runner-up)

Team competition finals

Davis Cup: 1 (1 runner-up)

ATP Challengers and ITF Futures finals

Singles: 8 (6–2)

Doubles: 5 (3–2)

Junior Grand Slam finals

Singles: 2 (2 runner-ups)

Doubles: 1 (1 title)

National representation

Davis Cup
Kokkinakis made his Davis Cup debut for Australia in February 2014 against France at the age of 17. He was selected to play in the fourth rubber, which was a dead rubber. He lost in straight sets to Julien Benneteau. 
He made his debut in a live rubber in 2015 with a comeback five-set win over Lukáš Rosol.

Record against top-10 players 
Kokkinakis' match record against players who have been ranked in the Top 10, with those who are active in boldface.
Only ATP Tour (incl. Grand Slams) main draw and Davis Cup matches are considered.

|- style="background:#efefef;" class="sortbottom"
| style="text-align:left;" colspan="7"|Number 1 ranked players

|- style="background:#efefef;" class="sortbottom"
| style="text-align:left;" colspan="7"|Number 2 ranked players

|- style="background:#efefef;" class="sortbottom"
| style="text-align:left;" colspan="7"|Number 3 ranked players

|- style="background:#efefef;" class="sortbottom"
| style="text-align:left;" colspan="7"|Number 4 ranked players

|- style="background:#efefef;" class="sortbottom"
| style="text-align:left;" colspan="7"|Number 5 ranked players

|- style="background:#efefef;" class="sortbottom"
| style="text-align:left;" colspan="7"|Number 6 ranked players

|- style="background:#efefef;" class="sortbottom"
| style="text-align:left;" colspan="7"|Number 7 ranked players

|- style="background:#efefef;" class="sortbottom"
| style="text-align:left;" colspan="7"|Number 8 ranked players

|- style="background:#efefef;" class="sortbottom"
| style="text-align:left;" colspan="7"|Number 9 ranked players

|- style="background:#efefef;" class="sortbottom"
| style="text-align:left;" colspan="7"|Number 10 ranked players

Wins over top 10 players
 Kokkinakis has a  record against players who were ranked in the top 10 at the time the match was played.

See also 
Australia Davis Cup team
List of Grand Slam men's doubles champions

References

External links

 
 
 
 

Living people
1996 births
Australian people of Greek descent
Australian male tennis players
Tennis players from Adelaide
Tennis players at the 2016 Summer Olympics
Olympic tennis players of Australia
Wimbledon junior champions
Hopman Cup competitors
Grand Slam (tennis) champions in men's doubles
Grand Slam (tennis) champions in boys' doubles
Naturalized citizens of Greece
People educated at Scotch College, Adelaide